Molinari Delicatessen is a delicatessen in San Francisco, California's North Beach, established in 1896, making it one of the oldest delis in the United States. They make their own brand of salami, as P.G. Molinari and Sons, Inc, which is sold nationwide, and which won a gold medal award in Italy.

History
Molinari's was founded by P.G. Molinari, who moved to San Francisco in 1884 from the Piedmont region of Italy. In 1895, one year after getting married, Molinari went into business for himself on Broadway. However, after the 1906 earthquake, he moved his business to 373 Columbus Avenue.

After WWI, his sons, Frank and Angelo, joined Molinari's as business partners.

After P.G. retired in 1950, Frank's son in law, Peter Giorgi, joined. And in 1978 P.G.'s great grandson, Frank Giorgi, entered after graduating from the University of California, Berkeley.

See also

 List of delicatessens
Other historic San Francisco Bay Area salame brands:
Columbus Salame
Gallo Salame

References

External links
Molinari's official website
Yelp Reviews

1896 establishments in California
Companies based in San Francisco
Delicatessens in California
Food and drink companies based in California
Food and drink in the San Francisco Bay Area
Food manufacturers of the United States
Italian-American cuisine
Italian-American culture in San Francisco
Landmarks in San Francisco
North Beach, San Francisco
Restaurants established in 1896
Restaurants in San Francisco